Verkhneuglichino (Ürge Ugliç) is a rural locality (a village) in Kabakovsky Selsoviet, Karmaskalinsky District, Bashkortostan, Russia. The population was 19 as of 2010. There are 2 streets.

Geography 
Verkhneuglichino is located 19 km northwest of Karmaskaly (the district's administrative centre) by road. Verkhnetimkino is the nearest rural locality.

References 

Rural localities in Karmaskalinsky District